Cyrtandra impar is a species of flowering plant in the family Gesneriaceae, native to Borneo. It can be distinguished from similar congeners by its tessellated bark.

References

impar
Endemic flora of Borneo
Plants described in 1927
Taxa named by Friedrich Wilhelm Ludwig Kraenzlin